World Love is an album by Canadian singer Lisa Lougheed.

World Love may also refer to:

"World Love," a song by the Magnetic Fields from their 1999 album 69 Love Songs
W.L.O. Sekai Renai Kikō, or World Love Organization, a Japanese adult visual novel

See also
A World of Love, a 1955 novel by Elizabeth Bowen
A World of Love (film), 1975 Argentine film